Jiří Januška (born 11 October 1997) is a Czech football player. He plays for Sokol Hostouň.

Club career
He made his Czech First League debut for 1. FK Příbram on 13 September 2015 in a game against FC Viktoria Plzeň.

References

External links
 

1997 births
Living people
Czech footballers
Czech Republic youth international footballers
1. FK Příbram players
MFK Vítkovice players
FC Sellier & Bellot Vlašim players
FC Slavoj Vyšehrad players
Czech First League players
Czech National Football League players
Association football midfielders